Fotografia (or similar) may refer to:

 "Fotografia" (Antônio Carlos Jobim song), 1959
 "Fotografia" (Carl Brave song), 2018
 "Fotografía" (Juanes and Nelly Furtado song), 2002
 Fotográfia (film), 1973 Hungarian film